Nanzhou Township (also spelled Nanjhou) is a rural township in Pingtung County, Taiwan.

Administrative divisions
The township comprises 10 villages: Milun, Nanan, Qikuai, Renli, Shouyuan, Tongan, Wanhua, Xibei, Xinan and Xizhou.

Education
 Tzu Hui Institute of Technology

Transportation
Nanzhou Township is accessible by Nanzhou Station of the TRA Pingtung Line.

References

External links

 Nanzhou Township Government Office 

Townships in Pingtung County